Edward C. Halperin, is the chancellor and CEO of New York Medical College (NYMC) and provost for biomedical affairs for the Touro College and University System, a position he has held since 2012.

Early life and education
Born in Somerville, New Jersey, Dr. Halperin graduated summa cum laude with a B.S. in economics from The Wharton School of the University of Pennsylvania followed by an M.D. cum laude from Yale School of Medicine of Yale University in 1979. He completed his internship in internal medicine at Stanford University and his residency at Harvard Medical School/Massachusetts General Hospital. He later earned an M.A. in history from Duke University, where he served on the faculty for 23 years, and rose to Department of Radiation Oncology chair then vice dean of Duke University School of Medicine and associate vice chancellor for academic affairs at Duke University Medical Center. Prior coming to NYMC in 2012, Dr. Halperin served as the twenty-third dean of University of Louisville School of Medicine from 2006-2011, and University of Louisville vice provost.

See also
New York Medical College
Touro College and University System

References

External links
New York Medical College Web Site

Duke University alumni
Living people
Yale University alumni
Year of birth missing (living people)